The World Tour is a co-headlining concert tour by British rock band Def Leppard and American rock band Mötley Crüe, taking place from February through August 2023 in venues across Latin America and Europe. During their previous tour, The Stadium Tour, the members of Def Leppard indicated that a European version of The Stadium Tour would take place in 2023. Tour dates were announced on October 20, 2022; this tour was advertised as The World Tour and confirmed to be a co-headlining tour of Def Leppard and Mötley Crüe. In addition to playing stadiums and entertainment venues, this tour will also feature appearances at international music festivals. This tour will also be Mötley Crüe's first without co-founder and original guitarist Mick Mars, who announced his retirement in October 2022. His place will instead be filled by John 5.

Special guests 
 Alice Cooper (Leg 4: North America)

Opening acts
 Whisky Blood (Leg 1: Latin America)
 Rata Blanca (Leg 1: Latin America)

Setlists

Tour dates

Cancelled tour dates

Personnel
Def Leppard
Rick Savage – bass, backing vocals
Joe Elliott – lead vocals, occasional acoustic guitar
Rick Allen – drums, percussion
Phil Collen – guitar, backing vocals
Vivian Campbell – guitar, backing vocals

Mötley Crüe
Nikki Sixx – bass, backing vocals
Vince Neil – lead vocals
Tommy Lee – drums, piano, backing vocals
John 5 – guitar

References

Notes

Citations

2023 concert tours
Co-headlining concert tours
Def Leppard concert tours
Mötley Crüe concert tours